Hesham Sallam (born 1975) is an Egyptian paleontologist and the founder of the Mansoura University Vertebrate Paleontology Center (MUVP-C), the first vertebrate paleontology program in the Middle East. He works as an associate professor at the American University in Cairo and Mansoura University. Sallam led the discovery and description of Mansourasaurus shahinae, a species of sauropod dinosaur from Egypt, which has improved understanding of the prehistory of Africa during the latest Cretaceous period. His work has helped popularize paleontology in Egypt.

Biography

Hesham Sallam was born in 1975 in Sharkia, Egypt. He received a bachelor's degree in geology from Mansoura University in 1997. He was a visiting scholar at Stony Brook University from 2008 to 2010, during which time he began planning what would become the MUVP. He received his Ph.D. from the University of Oxford in 2010, which made him the first Egyptian to have earned a doctorate in vertebrate paleontology in several decades. After completing his Ph.D., he returned to Egypt, where he worked at Mansoura University and founded the MUVP. Sallam is a professor at both the School of Sciences and Engineering, American University in Cairo (AUC) and at the Department of Geology, Mansoura University, Egypt. the American University in Cairo and Mansoura University.
 
In December 2013, Sallam and several graduate students found the partial skeleton of a dinosaur at the Dakhla Oasis in the Western Desert of Egypt. In February 2014 they returned to the site to excavate the specimen, which took 21 days. Sallam led a team of Egyptian and American paleontologists in describing the specimen, which was announced as belonging to a new species of sauropod, Mansourasaurus shahinae, in January 2018. The holotype specimen of Mansourasaurus is the most complete fossil of a terrestrial animal from the post-Cenomanian Cretaceous in mainland Africa, a period of nearly 30 million years which otherwise has a poorly-known fossil record in Africa. Mansourasaurus is closely related to European species, providing evidence that Africa was not entirely geographically isolated during the Late Cretaceous. The discovery attracted considerable media attention and has helped popularize paleontology in Egypt.

Sallam has been described as one of the most significant paleontologists in the Middle East. The MUVP is the first Middle Eastern research program dedicated to vertebrate paleontology. While fossils have been found in Egypt for over a century, prior to Sallam's founding of the MUVP, vertebrate paleontology research in Egypt was primarily conducted by foreigners. Sallam hopes to change that, using the MUVP both for public outreach and training the next generation of Egyptian vertebrate paleontologists. One of Sallam's students, Sanaa El-Sayed, is the first woman from the Middle East to have been the lead author on an internationally-published vertebrate paleontology research paper.

Selected publications

 
New adapiform primate fossils from the late Eocene of Egypt.(vol 29, pg 1, 2017), ER Seiffert, DM Boyer, JG Fleagle, GF Gunnell… - HISTORICAL BIOLOGY, 2017
A new species of the neopterygian fish Enchodus from the Duwi Formation, Campanian, Late Cretaceous, Western Desert, central Egypt, WL Holloway, KM Claeson, HM Sallam, S El-Sayed… - Acta Palaeontologica Polonica, 2017
A new genus and species of marine catfishes (Siluriformes; Ariidae) from the upper Eocene Birket Qarun Formation, Wadi El-Hitan, Egypt, SE El-Sayed, MA Kora, HM Sallam, KM Claeson… - PLoS One, 2017.
Erik R. Seiffert, Doug M. Boyer, John G. Fleagle, Gregg F. Gunnell, Christopher P. Heesy, Jonathan M. G. Perry & Hesham M. Sallam (2018) New adapiform primate fossils from the late Eocene of Egypt, Historical Biology, 30:1-2, 204-226, DOI: 10.1080/08912963.2017.1306522.2017
Robert J. Asher, Gregg F. Gunnell, Erik R. Seiffert, David Pattinson, Rodolphe Tabuce, Lionel Hautier & Hesham M. Sallam (2017) Dental eruption and growth in Hyracoidea (Mammalia, Afrotheria), Journal of Vertebrate Paleontology, 37:3, DOI: 10.1080/02724634.2017.1317638. 2017 
Patterns of dental emergence in early anthropoid primates from the Fayum Depression, Egypt, GF Gunnell, ER Miller, ER Seiffert, HM Sallam… - AMERICAN JOURNAL OF PHYSICAL …, Pages 157-165 | Received 19 Jan 2017, Accepted 08 Feb 2017, Published online: 21 Feb 2017
A new anthracothere (Artiodactyla) from the early Oligocene, Fayum, Egypt, and the mystery of African ‘Rhagatherium’solved, AH Sileem, HM Sallam, AGA Hewaidy, ER Miller… - Journal of Paleontology, 2016
Ancient phylogenetic divergence of the enigmatic African rodent Zenkerella and the origin of anomalurid gliding, S Heritage, D Fernández, HM Sallam, DT Cronin… - PeerJ, 2016
Vertebrate paleontological exploration of the Upper Cretaceous succession in the Dakhla and Kharga Oases, Western Desert, Egypt, HM Sallam, PM O'Connor, M Kora, JJW Sertich… - Journal of African Earth Sciences, 2016
Open access to Fayum primate fossils through the digital data archive MorphoSource, ER Seiffert, GF Gunnell, SW Heritage, HM Sallam… - Am. J. Phys. Anthropol, 2016
Sallam HM, Seiffert ER. 2016. New phiomorph rodents from the latest Eocene of Egypt, and the impact of Bayesian “clock”-based phylogenetic methods on estimates of basal hystricognath relationships and biochronology. PeerJ 4:e1717 https://doi.org/10.7717/peerj.1717
The first evidence of paleo-wildfire from the Campanian (Late Cretaceous) of North Africa, H El Atfy, H Sallam, A Jasper, D Uhl - Cretaceous Research, 2016
Deciduous dentition and dental eruption sequence of Bothriogenys fraasi (Anthracotheriidae, Artiodactyla) from the Fayum Depression, Egypt, HM Sallam, AH Sileem, ER Miller, GF Gunnell - Palaeontologia electronica, 2016
Anthracotheres (Mammalia, Artiodactyla) from the upper-most horizon of the Jebel Qatrani formation, latest Early Oligocene, Fayum depression, Egypt, AH Sileem, HM Sallam, AA Hewaidy, GF Gunnell… - Egyptian Journal of Paleontology, 2015
THE FIRST NEARLY COMPLETE NEUROCRANIUM OF A SILURIFORM (CATFISH) FROM THE UPPER EOCENE BIRKET QARUN FORMATION, WADI EL-HITAN, EGYPT  SE EL-SAYED, KM CLAESON, MA KORA, MS ANTAR, HM SALLAM. (2014)
A revision of the Upper Cretaceous lepidosirenid lungfishes from the Quseir Formation, Western Desert, central Egypt, KM Claeson, HM Sallam, PM O'Connor, JJW Sertich - Journal of Vertebrate Paleontology, 2014
Claeson Kerin; Sallam Hesham; O’Connor Patrick; Sertich Joseph. (2013) A Revision of the Upper Cretaceous lepidosirenid lungfishes from the Quseir Formation Western Desert Central Egypt (presently being given full consideration for publication in Jo. Jouranal of Vertebrate Paleontology
A basal phiomorph (Rodentia, Hystricognathi) from the late Eocene of the Fayum Depression, Egypt, HM Sallam, ER Seiffert, EL Simons - Swiss Journal of Palaeontology, 2012
A saurodontid fish from the Late Cretaceous of Dakhla Oasis, Western Desert, Egypt M Youssef, H Sallam, M Friedman, P O'Connor… - Journal of Vertebrate Paleontology, 2011
NEW GENERA OF HYSTRICOGNATHI (RODENTIA, MAMMALIA) FROM THE LATE EOCENE OF THE FAYUM DEPRESSION, NORTHERN EGYPT, H Sallam, E Seiffert, E Simons - JOURNAL OF VERTEBRATE PALEONTOLOGY, 2011
Craniodental morphology and systematics of a new family of hystricognathous rodents (Gaudeamuridae) from the Late Eocene and Early Oligocene of Egypt, HM Sallam, ER Seiffert, EL Simons - PLoS One, 2011
A large-bodied anomaluroid rodent from the earliest late Eocene of Egypt: Phylogenetic and biogeographic implications.Sallam HM Seiffert ER Simons EL and Brindley C (2010).
Craniodental morphology and systematics of a new family of hystricognathous rodents (Gaudeamuridae) from the Late Eocene and Early Oligocene of Egypt, HM Sallam, ER Seiffert, EL Simons - PLoS One, 2011
A highly derived anomalurid rodent (Mammalia) from the earliest late Eocene of Egypt, HM Sallam, ER Seiffert, EL Simons - Palaeontology, 2010
A fossil primate of uncertain affinities from the earliest late Eocene of Egypt ER Seiffert, EL Simons, DM Boyer, JMG Perry, TM Ryan, HM Sallam Proceedings of the National Academy of Sciences 107 (21), 9712-9717.
Sallam HM Seiffert ER and Simons EL (2010) A highly derived anomalurid rodent from the earliest late Eocene of Egypt
Late eocene rodents from The Fayum Depression, Egypt: Taxonomic, phylogenetic, and biogeographic implications, HME Sallam - 2010
Fossil and molecular evidence constrain scenarios for the early evolutionary and biogeographic history of hystricognathous rodents Hesham M. Sallam, Erik R. Seiffert, Michael E. Steiper, Elwyn L. Simons Proceedings of the National Academy of Sciences Sep 2009, 106 (39) 16722-16727; DOI: 10.1073/pnas.0908702106
The first evidence of palaeo-wildfire from the Late Cretaceous of North Africa, H El Atfy, H Sallam, A Jasper, D Uhl.
The first nearly complete neurocranium of a siluriform (catfish) from the Upper Eocene Birket Qarun Formation, Wadi El-Hitan, Egypt, SE EL-SAYED, KM CLAESON, MA KORA, MS ANTAR,
Stratigraphy and microfacies of the Senonian succession in west-central Sinai, Egypt, M Kora, H Hamama, H Sallam - Egyptian Journal Geology, 2003.
Senonian macrofauna from west-central Sinai: biostratigraphy and paleobiogeography, M Kora, H Hamama, H Sallam - Egyptian Journal of Paleontology. 2002
Kora M Hamama H and Sallam H (2002) Senonian macrofauna from west-central Sinai: biostratigraphy and biogeography
Kora M Hamama H and Sallam H (2002) Stratigraphy and microfacies of the Senonian in west-central Sinai Egypt

References

External links

https://www.facebook.com/hesham.sallam Facebook Page 
 https://www.scopus.com/authid/detail.uri?authorId=35316360700 Scopus Page

Egyptian geologists
Egyptian vertebrate paleontologists
Vertebrate paleontologists in Egypt
Academic staff of Mansoura University
Alumni of the University of Oxford
Living people
Egyptian expatriates in the United Kingdom
Year of birth missing (living people)
People from Sharqia Governorate